Dhamaal is a 2007 Bollywood comedy film.

Dhamaal or dhamal may also refer to:

 Dhamaal (film series), a trilogy beginning with the eponymous film
 Chang dance, a dance and music genre from Rajasthan, also called Dhamal or Dhamaal
 Dhamaal, a genre of songs honoring qalandars, or Sufi saints
 Dhamal, a form of Sufi whirling practiced in Pakistan
 Dhamal, a form of dance practiced in northern Bangladesh

See also
 Dumhal